Mosfellsbær (colloquially Mosó) is a town in south-west Iceland,  east of the country's capital, Reykjavík.

The town of Mosfellsbær is a 15-minute drive from midtown Reykjavík. The district includes the Leiruvogur cove, which forms part of Kollafjörður fjord. Three rivers empty into the cove: Leirvogsá, Kaldakvísl and Varmá.

Mosfellsbær provides numerous opportunities for outdoor and leisure activities. There has been a systematic development of outdoor recreational areas for residents, their guests and tourists.

Often called "the green town", the town enjoys thermal activity and a number of greenhouses have been built there. Since 1933 it has supplied the capital area with natural hot water for house heating, swimming pools, and other uses. The mountainous area around the town is visited for hiking, skiing, hunting and fishing for trout and char in the small lakes.

Landscape
The natural landscape of Mosfellsbær is rugged, and 80% of the district lies more than 100 metres above sea level. Hills such as Mosfell, Grímannsfell, Helgafell and Úlfarsfell, all 200–300 metres high, dominate the landscape; their slopes are grassy with screes. Two valleys lie between the hills: Mosfellsdalur and Reykjadalur. Most of the district's population live in the latter valley. In 1900, the population of the Mosfellsbær district (then Mosfellssveit) was just 400, but has grown rapidly, especially in the latter half of the 20th century, led by the utilisation of geothermal resources and development of a woollen industry. The population was 5849 on 1 December 1999.

The area around the Athletic Centre at Varmá is a recreational area.

The residential area extends from Leiruvogur into the nearby valleys, and curves around the mountains.

Travelers who head out of Reykjavík towards the west and north of Iceland will pass through Mosfellsbær on route 1, while the road to the Þingvellir National Park, route 36, branches off in Mosfellsbær up the Mosfellsdalur valley.

The town is bordered by the ocean at Leiruvogur. Three rivers run to the sea: Leirvogsá, Kaldakvísl and Varmá.

Discovery trail
The town has a number of walking trails and footpaths, as well as designated “information paths”, where signs provide information about the surroundings.

One walking/cycling path runs from the Reykjavík-Mosfellsbær border, along the coastline, to the sports complex at Varmá. There is also a walking path along the information path that runs from Álafosskvos to Reykir.

View from Lágafell
The top of Lágafellsklif provides views over the surrounding area. In good weather it’s possible to view the capital, Mt. Esja, Snæfellsjökul glacier and beyond. Landmarks and place names are marked on the viewing diagram. There is an information sign with the history of the church at the cemetery at Lágafell.

Álafosskvos - Stekkjarflöt
The sculpture “Hús skáldsins - hús tímans” by Magnús Tómasson stands at Stekkjarflöt at Álafosskvos. It is based on the town’s symbol and has references to the works of Halldór Laxness, Iceland’s Nobel Prize winner for literature in 1955. A large-scale wool industry built up around Álafoss waterfalls on the Varmá river between 1919 and 1955, and workers lived in the neighbourhood. Today, the old factory buildings have a new role: artists have turned them into workshops and galleries. The Álafoss factory outlet has objects from the old factories as well as photographs from that time, showing a fragment of the history of wool production in Mosfellsbær.

Halldór Laxness
Nobel Prize winner Halldór Laxness lived in the Mosfellsdalur valley. The farm on which he was raised now is the site of the historic Mosfellskirkja church. On the valley’s south side is a cluster of greenhouses. Laxness built a house for himself and his family at Köldukvísl, and named it Gljúfrasteinn. That house has now been turned into a museum. In his later years, the author wrote the book Í túninu heima (Home in the Hayfield), in which he described his childhood experiences at his home in the Mosfellsdalur valley.

Egill Skallagrímsson's resting place
Egill Skallagrímsson, the Viking poet and warrior, is supposedly buried near the town along with his silver treasure.

Local artists
Mosfellsbær is home to Sigur Rós's music studio Sundlaugin, which before their arrival was an abandoned building including a swimming pool (sundlaugin means "the swimming pool"). The acoustics created by the building having a swimming pool center bottom was one of the reasons that they decided on investing in the property for future use. Sundlaugin has been used for recording and mastering by a number of Icelandic musicians and others, including Amiina (which often tours with Sigur Rós) and Jimmy Lavelle from The Album Leaf.

Mosfellsbær filmmaker Vilius Petrikas was nominated in the 2018 Daytime Emmy Awards for Outstanding Cinematography in the TV show Ocean Treks with Jeff Corwin. In 2010 he won the fourth place spot in the YOBI Film contest from YOBI.tv's second season.

Ólafur Arnalds, neo-classical, indie, experimental, electronica multi-instrumentalist and producer, is also from Mosfellsbær.

KALEO, is a rock band that formed at Mosfellsbær in 2012, consisting of lead vocalist and guitarist JJ Julius Son, drummer David Antonsson, bassist Daniel Kristjansson, and lead guitarist Rubin Pollock.

Róbert Ingi Douglas, film director and producer, is from Mosfellsbær.

Clubs and activities
Added interest in all types of sports and outdoor activities has been met with the systematic development of the outdoor recreation areas, for the benefit of town residents, visitors and tourists. The area next to the sports complex at Varmá has a swimming pool and provided diverse possibilities for sporting activities, for both adults and children.

The local sports club Afturelding was founded in 1909. Today the club has about 3800 members. About 1200 people train and compete on behalf of the club in 11 divisions. The club has a lawful domicile in Mosfellsbær and is its residence in Varmá. The Mosfellsbær golf club is located outside the town in the Hlíðar neighborhood just by the ocean. The club consists of two golf courses, Hlíðavöllur, the 18-hole championship course, and Bakkakotsvöllur, a 9-hole course located in Mosfellsdalur. The Kjalarnesþing Lions Club started meeting here in 1965, changing its name in 1989 to the Mosfellsbær Lions Club.

Twin towns – sister cities

Mosfellsbær is twinned with:
 Loimaa, Finland
 Skien, Norway
 Thisted, Denmark
 Uddevalla, Sweden

References

External links

Official website 

Municipalities of Iceland
Populated places in Capital Region (Iceland)